Thadhi Jhijha is a Village in Bideha Municipality in Dhanusa District of the Madhesh Province of Nepal. At the time of the 1991 Nepal census it had a population of 5,870 persons living in 1021 individual households.

References

External links
UN map of the municipalities of Dhanusa District

Populated places in Dhanusha District